The Maumee River (pronounced ) is a river running in the United States Midwest from northeastern Indiana into northwestern Ohio and Lake Erie. It is formed at the confluence of the St. Joseph and St. Marys rivers, where Fort Wayne, Indiana has developed, and meanders northeastwardly for  through an agricultural region of glacial moraines before flowing into the Maumee Bay of Lake Erie. The city of Toledo is located at the mouth of the Maumee. The Maumee was designated an Ohio State Scenic River on July 18, 1974. The Maumee watershed is Ohio's breadbasket; it is two-thirds farmland, mostly corn and soybeans. It is the largest watershed of any of the rivers feeding the Great Lakes, and supplies five percent of Lake Erie's water.

History

Historically the river was also known as the Miami in United States treaties with Native Americans.  As early as 1671, French colonists called the river  'Miami of the Lake' (in contrast to the Miami of the Ohio or the Great Miami River, called  in the Miami-Illinois language). Maumee is an anglicized spelling of the Ottawa or Odawa name for the Miami tribe, . The Odawa had a village at the mouth of the Maumee River and occupied other territory in northwestern Ohio, including along its tributary, the Blanchard River.

After this decisive victory for General Anthony Wayne, in 1795 Native Americans ceded a twelve-mile square tract around Perrysburg and Maumee to the United States by the Treaty of Greenville. They ceded additional lands, north of the river and downstream of Defiance, in the 1807 Treaty of Detroit. They ceded the remainder of the Maumee River valley in the 1817 Treaty of Fort Meigs.

Prior to the development of canals, portages between the rivers were important trade routes. U.S. forces built forts such as Fort Loramie, Fort Recovery, and Fort Defiance along these routes.  In honor of General Wayne's victory on the banks of the Maumee, the primary bridge crossing the river near downtown Toledo is named the Anthony Wayne Suspension Bridge.

A dispute over control of part of the Maumee River region led to the so-called Toledo War between Ohio and the Michigan Territory.

Agricultural practices along the Maumee River have contributed in the 21st century to high phosphate levels in Lake Erie. This has triggered algae blooms in the lake. The drinking water from the city of Toledo was made unsafe for consumption for nearly a week in August 2014 because of such algae blooms.

Natural history

The Maumee River watershed was once part of the Great Black Swamp, a remnant of Glacial Lake Maumee, the proglacial ancestor of Lake Erie. The  swamp was a vast network of forests, wetlands, and grasslands, a rich habitat for numerous species of birds, animals, fish and flora.  During the 19th century, European-American settlers struggled to drain the swamp and to convert the land to farmland; they dramatically altered the habitat, reducing areas where species could flourish.

Transportation
The mouth of the river at Toledo and Lake Erie is wide and supports considerable commercial traffic, including oil, grain, and coal. The Miami and Erie Canal was built parallel to and north of the Maumee between Toledo and Defiance, Ohio, to enable extended transportation of shipped goods. The canal entered the river at a "slackwater" created by Independence Dam. It exited the river at Defiance and was built to the south, ending at Cincinnati, Ohio. While abandoned for commercial use, portions of the canal's towpath are maintained for recreational use in both Lucas and Henry counties. A restored section of canal, including a canal lock, is operated at Providence Metropark, where visitors can ride an authentic canal boat.

The Wabash and Erie Canal was constructed on the south side of the river, continuing southwest from Defiance to Fort Wayne, Indiana, crossing the "summit" to the Wabash River valley (in Miami-Illinois the Wabash River was known as Waapaahšiki siipiiwi).  Both canals were important pre-railway transportation methods in the 1840–60 period.

Watershed
This area includes a portion of southern Michigan. In addition to its source tributaries – the St. Joseph River (in Miami-Illinois: Kociihsasiipi) and St. Marys (in Miami-Illinois: Nameewa siipiiwi), the Maumee's principal tributaries are the Auglaize River and the Tiffin River, which join it at Defiance from the south and north, respectively.

Environmental Conditions

Great Lakes Area of Concern 

Due to environmental contamination, a portion of the river was designated a Great Lakes Area of Concern (AOC) under the Great Lakes Water Quality Agreement of 1987. The Maumee covers 8,316 square miles and has the largest drainage area of any Great Lakes river. The Maumee AOC is contained within 775 square miles of the river and includes several creeks. The environmental problems were caused by sediment contamination and agricultural runoff. The runoff caused large amounts of phosphorus to enter the river, eventually leading to cultural eutrophication in Lake Erie. Sediments at the site contained high levels of polychlorinated biphenyls (PCBs) and heavy metals, which came from old dumps, contaminated industrial sites, combined sewer overflows and disposal of dredged materials.

A 2006 remedial action plan for the AOC identified 10 "beneficial use impairments" caused by the pollution:

Added costs to industry and agriculture, which was removed in 2015 due to no additional costs required to treat the water prior to agricultural and industrial use
Restrictions on fish and wildlife consumption due to PCBs and heavy metals in sediments
Eutrophication or undesirable algae, which causes persistent water quality problems, such as nuisance algal blooms, decreased water clarity and decrease of dissolved oxygen in bottom waters
Degradation of fish and wildlife populations These levels are set based on what would be expected from the amount and quality of suitable physical, chemical and biological habitat present in the AOC.
Beach closings due to the potential for high bacteria levels caused by combined sewer overflows
Fish tumors or other deformities are caused by pollutants such as petroleum products and PCBs in the sediment and water.
Degradation of aesthetics Materials and events that might cause this include oil slicks, surface scum, combined sewer overflows, excessive dust or algal blooms.
Degradation of benthos, which was first documented in the 1950s and has been attributed to waste deposited old dumps, contaminated industrial sites, disposal of dredged materials and combined sewer overflows
Restriction on dredging activities Contaminants in sediment can get stirred up and reintroduced to the water column during dredging activities, which remove sediment and debris from the bottom of a lake or river.
Loss of fish and wildlife habitat Restoration actions include removing stream barriers, enhancing shoreline complexity, removing invasive species or restoring wetlands.

Islands

There are several small islands in the section of the Maumee River in northwest Ohio. The names of the islands are:

 Indian Island – near Farnsworth Park west of Toledo
 Woodcock Island – just west of Indian Island, adjacent to Missionary Island
 Missionary Island –  near Farnsworth Park west of Toledo
 Granger Island – near Waterville, Ohio
 Butler Island – near Farnsworth Metropark, adjacent to Missionary Island's North East side
 Grave Island – adjacent to Missionary Island on its south side, opposite of Butler Island
 Otter Island –  five miles downstream of Grand Rapids
 Hedges Island – located south side of Otter Island
 Millers Island – three miles downstream of Grand Rapids
 Caseys Island – west of Millers Island
 Sheets Island – close to Caseys Island
 Fox Island – two miles downstream of Grand Rapids
 Number 3 Island – two miles east of Grand Rapids
 Howard Island – near Grand Rapids Park, in Grand Rapids
 Buttonwood Island – located north of Howard Island
 Bluegrass Island – part of Side Cut Metropark
 Ewing Island – the largest island in the Maumee River, formerly McKee's Island, part of Audubon Islands State Nature Preserve
 Grape Island – immediately west of Ewing Island, part of Audubon Islands State Nature Preserve
 Marengo Island – near Maumee, Ohio
 Horseshoe Island – near Walbridge Park in Toledo
 Clark Island – near Walbridge Park in Toledo
 Corbutt Island – in Toledo
 Grassy Island – at the mouth of Grassy Creek at Rossford, Ohio.
 Girty's Island – two miles downstream of Florida, Ohio
 Sand Island – one mile upstream of Florida, Ohio
 Preston Island – near Defiance, Ohio
 Little Sisters Island – near Rossford, Ohio

Walleye run
According to the Ohio Department of Natural Resources, the annual walleye run up the Maumee River is one of the largest migrations of riverbound walleye east of the Mississippi. The migration of the walleye normally starts in early March and runs through the end of April. Although the first week of April is "historically" the peak of the migration, it varies according to environmental conditions. When river flows rise due to snow melt-off and the river water temperature reaches , the migration begins.  Walleye come to spawn from the western end of Lake Erie and the Detroit River and Lake St. Clair in Michigan. The most popular method of fishing for the migrating walleye is by wading out into the river and casting.

Cities and towns along the river

 Fort Wayne, Indiana
 New Haven, Indiana
 Antwerp, Ohio
 Cecil, Ohio
 Defiance, Ohio
 Florida, Ohio
 Napoleon, Ohio
 Grand Rapids, Ohio
 Waterville, Ohio
 Maumee, Ohio
 Perrysburg, Ohio
 Rossford, Ohio
 Toledo, Ohio
 Oregon, Ohio

See also
 List of Indiana rivers
 List of rivers of Ohio
  – list of ships named for the river

References

Further reading
 Arthur Benke & Colbert Cushing, Rivers of North America. Elsevier Academic Press, 2005.

External links

 Maumee Valley Heritage Corridor
 Maumee River Basin Commission (Indiana)
 
 Google Map of the Maumee River

Rivers of Indiana
Rivers of Ohio
Tributaries of Lake Erie
Rivers of Defiance County, Ohio
Rivers of Lucas County, Ohio
Rivers of Allen County, Indiana
Rivers of Paulding County, Ohio
Rivers of Wood County, Ohio
Rivers of Henry County, Ohio